Ethylene glycol dimethylacrylate (EGDMA) is a diester formed by condensation of two equivalents of methacrylic acid and one equivalent of ethylene glycol.  

EGDMA can be used in free radical copolymer crosslinking reactions.  When used with methyl methacrylate, it leads to gel point at relatively low concentrations because of the nearly equivalent reactivities of all the double bonds involved. 

It is used as a monomer to prepare Hydroxyapatite/Poly methyl methacrylate composites. EGDMA can be used in free radical copolymer crosslinking reactions.

Its toxicity profile has been fairly well studied. It is sometimes called ethylene dimethacrylate.

References

Monomers
Methacrylate esters
Glycol esters